The ISCM World Music Days is an annual contemporary music festival organized by the International Society for Contemporary Music, originally created in 1923 as the ISCM Festival as a means to support the most advanced composition tendencies. Each edition is held in a different location, and the programmes are organized by a jury after evaluating the submissions of each ISCM national section.

Editions

References

External links 
 World Music Days 2016 Tongyeong 
 Beijing Modern Music Festival 2018 
 World Music Days 2019 Tallinn
 official website

 
Classical music festivals in Europe
Contemporary music organizations
Music festivals staged internationally
Contemporary classical music festivals